The Law Comes to Texas is a 1939 American Western film directed by Joseph Levering and written by Nate Gatzert. The film stars Wild Bill Elliott, Veda Ann Borg, Bud Osborne, Slim Whitaker, Leon Beaumon and Paul Everton. The film was released on April 16, 1939, by Columbia Pictures.

Plot
The Governor of Texas sends attorney John Haynes to investigate a gang of outlaws using a law that prevents sheriffs from acting outside their county to escape after each raid. John disguises himself as an outlaw and joins the gang and has a plan to take them down.

Cast           
Wild Bill Elliott as John Haynes
Veda Ann Borg as Dora Lewis
Bud Osborne as Judge Jim Dean
Slim Whitaker as Barney Dalton 
Leon Beaumon as Jeff
Paul Everton as Governor
Charles King as Kaintuck

References

External links
 

1939 films
American black-and-white films
American Western (genre) films
1939 Western (genre) films
Columbia Pictures films
Films directed by Joseph Levering
1930s English-language films
1930s American films